Amnat Charoen municipal Stadium is a multi-purpose stadium in Amnat Charoen province , Thailand.  It is currently used mostly for football matches and is the home stadium of Amnat Poly United F.C.  The stadium holds ? people.

Multi-purpose stadiums in Thailand
Buildings and structures in Amnat Charoen province
Sport in Amnat Charoen province